The theory of quantum error correction plays a prominent role in the practical realization and engineering of
quantum computing and quantum communication devices. The first quantum
error-correcting codes  are strikingly similar to classical block codes  in their
operation and performance. Quantum error-correcting codes restore a noisy,
decohered quantum state to a pure quantum state. A
stabilizer quantum error-correcting code appends ancilla qubits
to qubits that we want to protect. A unitary encoding circuit rotates the
global state into a subspace of a larger Hilbert space. This highly entangled,
encoded state corrects for local noisy errors. A quantum error-correcting code makes quantum computation
and quantum communication practical by providing a way for a sender and
receiver to simulate a noiseless qubit channel given a noisy qubit channel
whose noise conforms to a particular error model.

The stabilizer theory of quantum error correction allows one to import some
classical binary or quaternary codes for use as a quantum code. However, when importing the
classical code, it must satisfy the dual-containing (or self-orthogonality)
constraint. Researchers have found many examples of classical codes satisfying
this constraint, but most classical codes do not. Nevertheless, it is still useful to import classical codes in this way (though, see how the entanglement-assisted stabilizer formalism overcomes this difficulty).

Mathematical background 

The stabilizer formalism exploits elements of
the Pauli group  in formulating quantum error-correcting codes. The set
 consists of the Pauli operators:

The above operators act on a single qubit – a state represented by a vector in a two-dimensional
Hilbert space. Operators in  have eigenvalues  and either commute
or anti-commute. The set  consists of -fold tensor products of
Pauli operators:

Elements of  act on a quantum register of  qubits. We
occasionally omit tensor product symbols in what follows so that

The -fold Pauli group
 plays an important role for both the encoding circuit and the
error-correction procedure of a quantum stabilizer code over  qubits.

Definition 

Let us define an  stabilizer quantum error-correcting
code to encode  logical qubits into  physical qubits. The rate of such a
Its stabilizer  is an abelian subgroup of the
-fold Pauli group . 
does not contain the operator . The simultaneous
-eigenspace of the operators constitutes the codespace. The
codespace has dimension  so that we can encode  qubits into it. The
stabilizer  has a minimal representation in terms of 
independent generators

The generators are
independent in the sense that none of them is a product of any other two (up
to a global phase). The operators  function in the same
way as a parity check matrix does for a classical linear block code.

Stabilizer error-correction conditions 

One of the fundamental notions in quantum error correction theory is that it
suffices to correct a discrete error set with support in the Pauli group
. Suppose that the errors affecting an
encoded quantum state are a subset  of the Pauli group :

encoded quantum state either commutes or anticommutes with any particular
The error  is correctable if it
An anticommuting error
computing a syndrome  identifying . The syndrome is a binary
vector  with length  whose elements identify whether the
error  commutes or anticommutes with each . An error
It corrupts the encoded state if it
So we compactly summarize the stabilizer error-correcting conditions: a
stabilizer code can correct any errors  in  if

or

Example of a stabilizer code

An example of a stabilizer code is the five qubit
 stabilizer code. It encodes  logical qubit
into  physical qubits and protects against an arbitrary single-qubit
error. It has code distance . Its stabilizer consists of  Pauli operators:

The above operators commute. Therefore, the codespace is the simultaneous
+1-eigenspace of the above operators. Suppose a single-qubit error occurs on
the encoded quantum register. A single-qubit error is in the set  where  denotes a Pauli error on qubit .
It is straightforward to verify that any arbitrary single-qubit error has a
unique syndrome. The receiver corrects any single-qubit error by identifying
the syndrome via a parity measurement and applying a corrective operation.

Relation between Pauli group and binary vectors 

vector space . This mapping gives a
simplification of quantum error correction theory. It represents quantum codes
with binary vectors and binary operations rather than with Pauli operators and
matrix operations respectively.

We first give the mapping for the one-qubit case. Suppose 
is a set of equivalence classes of an operator  that have the same phase:

Let  be the set of phase-free Pauli operators where
.
Define the map  as

Suppose . Let us employ the
For
example, suppose . Then . The
map  induces an isomorphism  because addition of vectors
Pauli operators up to a global phase:

Let  denote the symplectic product between two elements :

The symplectic product  gives the commutation relations of elements of
:

The symplectic product and the mapping  thus give a useful way to phrase
Pauli relations in terms of binary algebra.
The extension of the above definitions and mapping  to multiple qubits is
straightforward. Let  denote an
We can similarly define the phase-free
-qubit Pauli group  where

The group operation  for the above equivalence class is as follows:

The equivalence class  forms a commutative group
under operation . Consider the -dimensional vector space

It forms the commutative group  with
operation  defined as binary vector addition. We employ the notation
 to represent any vectors
 respectively. Each
vector  and  has elements  and  respectively with

or

Let us define a map  as follows:

Let

so that  and  belong to the same
equivalence class:

The map  is an isomorphism for the same
reason given as in the previous case:

where . The symplectic product
captures the commutation relations of any operators  and :

The above binary representation and symplectic algebra are useful in making
the relation between classical linear error correction and quantum error correction more explicit.

By comparing quantum error correcting codes in this language to symplectic vector spaces, we can see the following. A symplectic subspace corresponds to a direct sum of Pauli algebras (i.e., encoded qubits), while an isotropic subspace corresponds to a set of stabilizers.

References

 D. Gottesman, "Stabilizer codes and quantum error correction," quant-ph/9705052, Caltech Ph.D. thesis. https://arxiv.org/abs/quant-ph/9705052
 
 
 
 A. Calderbank, E. Rains, P. Shor, and N. Sloane, “Quantum error correction via codes over GF(4),” IEEE Trans. Inf. Theory, vol. 44, pp. 1369–1387, 1998. Available at https://arxiv.org/abs/quant-ph/9608006

Linear algebra
Quantum computing